Yvette Julie Wray (née Luker, born 18 October 1958) is a female former English pentathlete, hurdler and sprinter. Born in Scraptoft, Leicestershire, she competed for Great Britain at the Olympic Games in Moscow 1980. She also represented England at the Commonwealth Games in 1978 and 1982, winning two bronze medals.

Career
At the age of 19, Wray competed internationally for the first time at the 1978 Commonwealth Games and achieved immediate success, earning the bronze medal in the Pentathlon with a score of 4211 points. She competed later in the year at the European Athletics Championships, finishing 15th in the Pentathlon, although later disqualifications to other competitors due to doping violations promoted her to 13th place.

In 1979 Wray participated in the Summer Universiade and helped the British 4 × 100 m relay team achieve a  silver medal, narrowly behind the Soviet Union team. Her performances internationally and domestically earned her a place in the Pentathlon at the 1980 Summer Olympics, where she finished 16th with 4159 points, one place behind fellow British pentathlete Sue Longden.

Wray competed in the 50 metre hurdles at the 1981 European Athletics Indoor Championships, but failed to progress beyond the semifinals. Later in the year however, Wray performed strongly at the Universiade, helping the British team to 4 × 100 m relay silver once again, just 0.2 s behind the United States team.

At the 1982 Commonwealth Games, Wray earned her second Commonwealth bronze medal, this time in the 400 m hurdles. She also contributed to the English 4 × 400 m relay team, but a mistake in her baton changeover with Gladys Taylor dropped England out of medal contention and they could only finish 4th. Later in the year Wray participated in the European Athletics Championships 400 m hurdles, where she was eliminated in the heats.

During her final year of international competition, Wray represented England, at the 1986 Commonwealth Games in Edinburgh, Scotland competing in the 1986 Commonwealth Games 400 m hurdles, reaching the final and finishing in 5th place. Her last international event was at the 1986 European Athletics Championships in the 400 m hurdles, but she failed to progress beyond the heats.

Domestic achievements
Throughout her career Wray achieved a lot of national success, particularly at the AAA Championships where she won three 400 m hurdles titles and one 2nd-place finish between 1982 and 1986. She also claimed a 1st and two 2nd-place finishes in the pentathlon between 1977 and 1980, and a 2nd and 3rd-place finish in the 100 m hurdles in 1980 and 1978 respectively. At the Indoor AAA Championships Wray was dominant at the 60 m hurdles, taking the title from 1980–1982, as well as finishing second in 1979 and 1983. She also achieved a 2nd-place finish at the 400 metre sprint in 1984.

At the UK Athletics Championships, Wray won the 400 m hurdle title in 1986, to add the 3rd-place finish she had achieved in 1982. She also came 2nd in the 1979 100 m hurdles.

Personal bests
400 metre hurdles – 56.46 s, 11 July 1981, Oslo
Pentathlon – 4278 pts, July 15, 1979, Bremerhaven

International Results

References

1958 births
Living people
British female sprinters
English female sprinters
British female hurdlers
English female hurdlers
British pentathletes
Olympic athletes of Great Britain
Athletes (track and field) at the 1980 Summer Olympics
Commonwealth Games medallists in athletics
Commonwealth Games bronze medallists for England
Athletes (track and field) at the 1978 Commonwealth Games
Athletes (track and field) at the 1982 Commonwealth Games
Universiade medalists in athletics (track and field)
Universiade silver medalists for Great Britain
Medalists at the 1979 Summer Universiade
Medalists at the 1981 Summer Universiade
Medallists at the 1978 Commonwealth Games
Medallists at the 1982 Commonwealth Games